The South Korean National Liberation Front Preparation Committee was a left-wing and Pro-North Korea organization in South Korea active from 1976 to 1979.

The South Korean National Liberation Front Preparation Committee was created by South Korean leftists, in order to propagate socialist and communist ideas to the South Korean masses. The eventual goal of the SKNLF-PC was to organize the South Korean people and wage a guerrilla war similar to that of the Viet Cong in South Vietnam, hoping to eventually create a socialist state and reunify with North Korea. The South Korean National Liberation Front was dissolved after many members were exposed and arrested by the South Korean military regime, including poet Kim Nam-ju. The National Liberation Front Incident is often compared to other instances where the South Korean state exposed (or at least claimed to have exposed) clandestine communist organization, such as the Revolutionary Reunification Party Incident and the People's Revolutionary Party Incident.

The flag of the South Korean National Liberation Front was based on the flag of North Korea. It closely resembled the way the flag of Viet Cong was modified from the flag of North Vietnam.

See also 
 People's Revolutionary Party Incident, related incidents in the past

References

Citations

Sources 
 
 

1976 establishments in South Korea
1979 disestablishments in South Korea
Communism in South Korea
Fourth Republic of Korea
Juche political parties
Organizations established in 1976
Organizations disestablished in 1979
Political organizations based in South Korea